Bedok Bus Interchange is an air-conditioned bus interchange located in the approximate center of Bedok. It is situated along Bedok North Interchange and Bedok North Drive, on the second level of Bedok Mall. It is connected to Bedok MRT station. It is the 2nd busiest bus interchange in Singapore, with 28 bus services operating from it.

History
The original facility opened on 25 February 1979. It was the first interchange in Singapore to use a colour-coded queue scheme.

Soon after it opened, in 1981, the interchange was partially demolished and expanded at a cost of S$3 million, and work was completed in 1983. After the expansion, the interchange covered  ands had 32 end-on berths, 7 sawtooth berths and 33 remote parking bays.  Several bus services were moved to the interchange from Chai Chee Bus Terminal when the terminal closed in 1985. Bedok MRT station opened in 1989 at the south of the original facility, complementing the bus interchange to serve people travelling within Bedok town and also the nearby East Coast Park.

In the 2003 URA Masterplan, it was indicated that the bus interchange would be redeveloped. This was confirmed in early 2011 when HDB announced plans to rejuvenate Bedok, which involved redeveloping the Bedok town centre and rebuilding the original facility into an air-conditioned one, integrated with a proposed commercial development (Bedok Mall) and proposed residential development (Bedok Residences), resembling Boon Lay Bus Interchange. The original facility was demolished after 32 years of operations, to make way for the development.

On 19 November 2011, the original bus interchange moved to a temporary site along Bedok North Drive to allow the original facility to be rebuilt as planned.

The new Bedok Integrated Transport Hub (ITH) began operations on 30 November 2014. With the completion of the ITH, Bedok residents are able to transfer in air-conditioned comfort between bus and MRT services at Bedok MRT station. It is the 7th air-conditioned bus interchange in Singapore.

Bus Contracting Model

Under the new bus contracting model, all the bus routes were split into 9 route packages. Bus Service 854 is under Sembawang-Yishun Bus Package, Bus Service 16 is under Bukit Merah Bus Package, Bus Service 17 is under Loyang Bus Package, Bus Services 26 and 155 are under Bishan-Toa Payoh Bus Package, Bus Services 7, 32, 33 and 197 are under Clementi Bus Package, Bus Services 38 and 69 are under Tampines Bus Package, Bus Service 87 is under Sengkang-Hougang Bus Package, Bus Service 60 is under Serangoon-Eunos Bus Package and the rest of the bus services are under Bedok Bus Package.

Currently, Bus Service 17 (Loyang Bus Package) is operated by Go-Ahead Singapore. Bus Service 854 (Sembawang-Yishun Bus Package) is currently operated by Tower Transit Singapore. All remaining bus services are operated by the anchor operator, SBS Transit.

List of routes

References

External links
 Interchanges and Terminals (SBS Transit)
 Interchange/Terminal (SMRT Buses)

2014 establishments in Singapore
Bus stations in Singapore
Bedok